James Joseph Sloyan (born February 24, 1940 in Indianapolis, Indiana) is an American actor.

Early years 
Sloyan left the United States at an early age to live abroad in Rome, Capri, Milan, Switzerland, and Ireland. His career in show business began upon his return to the United States, in 1957, when Sloyan received a scholarship to the American Academy of Dramatic Arts. Sloyan's acting career was interrupted in 1962, when he was drafted into the United States Army during the Vietnam War.

Career

Television

Sloyan's television career includes numerous brief performances on daytime dramas The Young and the Restless, General Hospital, and Ryan's Hope, and guest appearances on prime-time series Wonder Woman; Baywatch; Quantum Leap; The X-Files; MacGyver; Party of Five; Matlock; Murder, She Wrote; and Dr. Quinn, Medicine Woman. He appeared in the television movies Blind Ambition, Billionaire Boys Club, and My Son Is Innocent.

Sloyan has appeared in a number of science fiction television series, including Buck Rogers in the 25th Century, in which he portrayed Barnard "Barney" Smith in the episode "The Plot to Kill a City", and several roles in the Star Trek franchise. In Star Trek: The Next Generation, he portrayed Alidar Jarok (a defecting Romulan admiral) in "The Defector", and Alexander Rozhenko (Worf's son) as an adult in the future, in "Firstborn". In Star Trek: Deep Space Nine, he portrayed the Bajoran scientist Mora Pol and Odo's guardian scientist in the episodes "The Begotten" and "The Alternate". The Star Trek: Voyager episode "Jetrel" features Sloyan as the title character.

Film
Sloyan is featured in The Sting as Mottola, who is used to illustrate the concept of a griftee, in a variation on the pigeon drop scam.

He has played roles in The Traveling Executioner (1970), The Gang That Couldn't Shoot Straight (1971), and Xanadu (1980).

Advertisements
Sloyan was a voice-over actor for Sprint Nextel long-distance services, and in film trailers for movies such as Jumper, The Shadow, and How to Make an American Quilt.

Sloyan performed "the voice of Lexus", having done voice-overs in American television advertisements for Lexus since the make's introduction to the American market. In 2009, he was replaced by actor James Remar. Sloyan now voices ads for Mitsubishi.

Personal life
Sloyan and Deirdre Lenihan, an actress, have been married since 1973. They are the parents of actors Daniel Sloyan and Samantha Sloyan.

Partial filmography

References

External links 
 
 

1940 births
Living people
American male film actors
American male television actors
American male voice actors
Male actors from Indianapolis